Roman Vojtek (born 14 April 1972) is a Czech actor, television presenter, and singer.

Life and career

Early life and education
Vojtek, born in Vsetín in the former Czechoslovakia, had to take care of himself from the age of fourteen due to the death of his parents. While studying musical theatre at JAMU in Brno, he worked as an actor at Brno City Theatre. After graduating, he went to Prague, where got a job at Musical Theatre Karlín.

Acting and singing work

Vojtek has continued to perform in theatre, most recently at Dům U Hybernů. He has also appeared in a number of television productions and films.
In 2006, he took part in the first installment of the reality dance show StarDance.
In 2016, he participated in the reality show Tvoje tvář má známý hlas, the Czech version of Your Face Sounds Familiar.

Personal life
In 2009, he married longtime girlfriend Tereza Janoušová, with whom he has two children: Edia (born 2009) and Benedikt (born 2015).
He is currently married to actress and singer Petra Vojtková, with whom he has a son, Nathaniel (born 2020).

Selected filmography

Film

Television

References

External links
 

1972 births
Living people
Czech male television actors
Czech male film actors
People from Vsetín